List of West German films of 1957. Feature films produced and distributed in West Germany in 1957.

A–Z

Bibliography 
 Davidson, John & Hake, Sabine. Framing the Fifties: Cinema in a Divided Germany. Berghahn Books, 2007.
Fehrenbach, Heide. Cinema in Democratizing Germany: Reconstructing National Identity After Hitler. University of North Carolina Press, 1995.

See also
 List of Austrian films of 1957
 List of East German films of 1957

External links 
filmportal.de listing for films made in 1957

West German
Lists of German films
film